Kalanchak is an urban-type settlement in Skadovsk Raion, Kherson Oblast, southern Ukraine. It hosts the administration of the Kalanchak settlement hromada, one of the hromadas of Ukraine. It has a population of

Administrative status 
Until 18 July, 2020, Kalanchak was the administrative center of Kalanchak Raion. The raion was abolished in July 2020 as part of the administrative reform of Ukraine, which reduced the number of raions of Kherson Oblast to five. The area of Kalanchak Raion was merged into Skadovsk Raion.

History 

The settlement was founded in 1794 as a home for exiled participants in the Turbai uprising. Kalanchak became the site of the first attack on Ukraine during the 2022 Russian invasion of Ukraine, when Russian soldiers attacked an outpost in the town.

Transportation
It is on the railway which used to connect Kherson with Dzhankoi; however, after the Russian annexation of Crimea in 2014, the trains only run as far as Vadim, close to the border with Crimea. There is infrequent passenger traffic.

The settlement has access to Highway M17, which runs north to Kherson and south to the border with Crimea.

See also 

 Russian occupation of Kherson Oblast

References

Urban-type settlements in Skadovsk Raion
Russia–Ukraine border crossings
1794 establishments in Ukraine
Populated places established in 1794